The 2021 Campeón de Campeones was a Mexican football match that took place on 18 July 2021. The match is the sixth edition of the modern Campeón de Campeones, contested by the Liga MX season's Apertura and Clausura champions. The 2021 edition featured Club León, the Apertura champion, and Cruz Azul, the Clausura champion. The match took place at Dignity Health Sports Park in Carson, California, hosting for the fifth time. Like previous editions, the Campeón de Campeones was contested at a neutral venue in the United States.

The winner of this match qualified for the 2021 Campeones Cup and take on the 2020 Major League Soccer champions Columbus Crew on 29 September 2021 at Lower.com Field in Columbus, Ohio.

Match details

Details

References

Campeón de Campeones
Campeón de Campeones
July 2021 sports events in Mexico
Mex